My Sugar Babe is the seventh single by Japanese singer-songwriter Tatsuro Yamashita, released on October 21, 1980.

Overview
My Sugar Babe and the coupling song Daydream are both taken from the album Ride on Time by Tatsuro Yamashita.

He had the vague desire to write a song like this for quite some time but when he started to work on the album "Ride on Time", he felt that now was the right time, so he wrote it. The song was used as a theme song for the Japanese detective drama series Keishi-K which aired on NTV. Additionally, an instrumental version from the drama was included in the bonus tracks of the remastered edition of "Ride on Time" and a short version was also included in the "Special Bonus Disc" of his 2002 compilation album The RCA/Air Years LP Box 1976-1982.

In 1994, Sugar Babe's album "" containing the original mix was released for the first time in CD. Yamashita also held a live performance titled "TATSURO YAMASHITA Sings SUGAR BABE" on that same year in which My Sugar Babe was performed live as the last song of the performance.

Daydream is a song written by Minako Yoshida. Yamashita said that this was the best lyrics that she had ever written for him, and she is the only one who could have came up with the idea of creating lyrics from an acrylic color chart in order to clear a melody with a detailed musical arrangement that is difficult to translate into Japanese.

Tatsuro Yamashita is laid out on the front jacket, while Shintaro Katsu and the song's lyrics are laid out on the back of the jacket.

Track listing

Personnel

My Sugar Babe
Tatsuro Yamashita – Electric Guitar (Right), Glocken & Background Vocals
Jun Aoyama – Drums
Koki Ito – Bass
Kazuo Shiina – Electric Guitar (Left)
Toshiaki Usui – Acoustic Guitar
Hiroyuki Namba – Keyboards
Nobu Saito – Percussion

Daydream
Tatsuro Yamashita – Electric Guitar (Right), Percussion & Background Vocals
Jun Aoyama – Drums
Koki Ito – Bass
Kazuo Shiina – Electric Guitar (Left)
Hiroyuki Namba – Keyboards
Nobu Saito – Percussion
Shin Kazuhara – Trumpet
Yoshihiro Nakagawa – Trumpet
Shigeharu Mukai – Trombone (Solo)
Tadanori Konakawa – Trombone
Takeru Muraoka – Tenor Sax
Shunzo Sunahara – Baritone Sax

Chart positions

References

1980 songs
1980 singles
Japanese pop songs
Japanese rock songs